Kanoia is a genus of sea snails, marine gastropod mollusks in the family Cataegidae.

Species
 Kanoia meroglypta (McLean & Quinn, 1987)
 Kanoia myronfeinbergi Warén & Rouse, 2016

References

 McLean, J.H. & Quinn J.F., 1987. Categis, new genus of three new species from the continental slope (Trochidae: Cataeginae New subfamily). The Nautilus 101(3): 111-116
 Warén A. & Rouse G.W. (2016). A new genus and species of Cataegidae (Gastropoda: Seguenzioidea) from eastern Pacific Ocean methane seeps. Novapex. 17(4): 59-66.

External links
 

Cataegidae